Albin Nyamoya (27 July 1924 – 2001) was the Prime Minister of Burundi from 6 April 1964 — 7 January 1965 and again from 14 July 1972— 5 June 1973.

Nyamoya, an ethnic Tutsi from Ngozi province, was a member of the Union for National Progress (UPRONA) party. He served as Interior Minister from 1963 to 1964. Nyamoya died in 2001.

References

Works cited 
 

1924 births
2001 deaths
Union for National Progress politicians
Prime Ministers of Burundi
Interior ministers of Burundi
Tutsi people
People from Ngozi Province